Hans-Hermann "Hannes" Sprado (born 3 July 1956 in Bassum; died 24 July 2014) was a German journalist and author. Until his death he was editor-in-chief and publisher of the popular science magazine P.M. Magazin.

Life 
Sprado started his career as journalist with an editorial department traineeship at the Weser-Kurier in Bremen. Later he worked as editor for Bunte, Bild and the German Marie Claire. Since 1994 he worked for Gruner + Jahr. He became editor-in-chief of P.M. and also installed line extensions such as P.M. Biografie and P.M. History. Sprado also wrote novels and popular science books.

He lived with his family in Neubruchhausen near Bremen.

Works 
 Risse im Ruhm. Münster, Solibro, 2005, 
 Tod auf der Fashion Week. Münster, Solibro, 2007, 
 Das dunkle Ritual. Reinbek bei Hamburg, Rowohlt-Taschenbuch-Verlag, 2009, 
 Runengrab. Reinbek bei Hamburg, Rowohlt-Taschenbuch-Verlag, 2009, 
 Verfressen, sauschnell, unkaputtbar: Das phantastische Leben der Kakerlaken. Ullstein. Berlin, Ullstein, 2012, 
 Kalt kommt der Tod. Bremen, Edition Temmen, 2013, 
 Der Klang des Weltalls: Wie Planetentöne, heilige Klänge und die Musik der Natur heilen können. Arkana, 2014,

References

External links 
 Hans-Hermann Sprado at solibro.de

German journalists
German male journalists
1956 births
2014 deaths
German male writers